Midnight Special is an album by the American jazz organist Jimmy Smith, recorded in 1960 and released on the Blue Note label. The album was recorded at the same session that produced Back at the Chicken Shack (1960).

Reception
The AllMusic review by Scott Yanow called the album "highly recommended".

Track listing
 "Midnight Special" (Jimmy Smith) – 9:57
 "A Subtle One" (Turrentine) – 7:44
 "Jumpin' the Blues" (Walter Brown, Jay McShann, Parker) – 5:27
 "Why Was I Born?" (Hammerstein II, Kern) – 6:35
 "One O'Clock Jump" (Basie) – 7:00

Personnel
 Jimmy Smith – organ
 Stanley Turrentine – tenor saxophone
 Kenny Burrell – guitar (1,3,5)
 Donald Bailey – drums

Production
 Alfred Lion – producer
 Rudy Van Gelder – engineer
 Reid Miles – design
 Francis Wolff – photography
 Del Shields – liner notes

References

Blue Note Records albums
Jimmy Smith (musician) albums
1961 albums
Albums produced by Alfred Lion
Albums recorded at Van Gelder Studio